Benita Valente (born October 19, 1934) is an American soprano whose career has encompassed the operatic stage as well as performance of lieder, chamber music and oratorio. She is especially lauded for her interpretations of Mozart and Handel, but she also excelled in certain Verdi roles.  The New York Times once referred to her as "as gifted a singer as we have today, worldwide."

Early life 
Benita Valente was born in Delano, California.  She studied voice at the Music Academy of the West in Santa Barbara with Lotte Lehmann and Martial Singher. She later studied with Margaret Harshaw at the Curtis Institute of Music in Philadelphia where she graduated in 1960. That same year she won the Metropolitan Opera National Council Auditions and made her formal debut at the Marlboro Music Festival with famed pianist Rudolf Serkin, among others. At Marlboro Valente met her husband Anthony Checchia.

Career 
Early in her career, she appeared regularly at the Freiberg Opera in Germany. She made a notable debut with the Metropolitan Opera on Sept. 22, 1973 singing Pamina in The Magic Flute. A regular at the Met, her many roles included Gilda in Rigoletto, Nanetta in Falstaff, Susanna in The Marriage of Figaro, Ilia in Idomeneo and Almirena in Rinaldo.

As a chamber performer, she has collaborated with the Guarneri, Juilliard and Orion String Quartets. She has performed with numerous instrumentalists, including cellist Yo-Yo Ma, clarinetist Richard Stoltzman and pianists Emanuel Ax, Leon Fleisher and Richard Goode, and she made a celebrated recording of Schubert's Shepherd on the Rock with pianist Rudolf Serkin and clarinetist Harold Wright.

In 1971 and 1972, Valente performed alongside modern dancer Mimi Kagan in the composer Earl Kim's work "Exercises en Route", which toured.

Among the composers who have written music for Valente are William Bolcom, Alberto Ginastera, John Harbison, Libby Larsen and Richard Wernick. She has performed with numerous opera companies and symphony orchestras throughout the world and has recorded extensively in wide-ranging repertoire.

Valente has been recorded by at least seventeen recording companies. She received a Grammy Award for her recording of Arnold Schoenberg's Quartet No.2 and a Grammy nomination for her recording of Haydn's Seven Last Words of Christ, both performed with the Juilliard String Quartet.  In 1999 she was the recipient of the Richard J. Bogomolny National Service Award, the highest honor bestowed by Chamber Music America, for her contributions to chamber music – the first vocalist to be so honored in the 20-year history of the award.

Late life 
Valente retired from singing in October, 2000. She lives in Philadelphia with her husband, bassoonist Anthony Checchia, who is the founder and artistic director of the Philadelphia Chamber Music Society and administrator for the Marlboro Music School and Festival. Her son, Pete Checchia, also based in Philadelphia, is an accomplished photographer and artist.

Increasingly, she has devoted her time to teaching vocal master classes. She has taught at the Marlboro Music School and Festival in Marlboro, Vermont; Cincinnati Conservatory program in Lucca, Italy; the European Mozart Academy in Poland; the Metropolitan Opera Lindemann Young Artists Development Program; the Stearns Institute for Young Artists at Ravinia and the Young Artist Program of the National Arts Centre's Summer Music Institute in Ottawa. She most recently teaches at Temple University.

Notable recordings 

William Bolcom: Briefly It Enters and Let Evening Come (Centaur Records)
Libby Larsen: Songs From Letters From Calamity Jane to Her Daughter Janey and Songs of Light and Love, Scottish Chamber Orchestra, Joel Revzen dir. (Koch International)

Three string quartets performed with the Juilliard String Quartet (Bridge Records):
John Harbison The Rewaking
Alberto Ginastera String Quartet No. 3
Richard Wernick String Quartet No. 5
 Franz Schubert: Der Hirte auf dem Felsen (Sony Classical 48176) 
 Johannes Brahms: Liebeslieder Waltzes, Op. 52 (Sony Classical 48176)

References

External links
Interview with Benita Valente by Bruce Duffie, May 7, 1987

1934 births
Living people
People from Delano, California
American operatic sopranos
Curtis Institute of Music alumni
Winners of the Metropolitan Opera National Council Auditions
Singers from California
Music Academy of the West alumni
Temple University faculty
Voice teachers
20th-century American women opera singers
Classical musicians from California
Women music educators
American women academics
21st-century American women